Wang Guanyin (born September 9, 1986, in Tianjin) is a retired male Chinese gymnast. At the 2009 World Artistic Gymnastics Championships he became world champion on parallel bars.

References

External links
 

1986 births
Living people
Chinese male artistic gymnasts
Medalists at the World Artistic Gymnastics Championships
Gymnasts from Tianjin
World champion gymnasts
21st-century Chinese people